Zander Insurance is an independent insurance agency headquartered in Nashville, Tennessee. One of the largest agencies in the country, Zander shops rates across all lines of insurance, including: term life, disability, home and auto, long-term care, group benefits, business insurance, and more, while also offering a comprehensive ID theft protection product. Zander has earned the business and endorsement of radio and television personalities including Dave Ramsey, Eddie George, and Tony Gaskins. In 2012, Zander partnered with Answer Financial Insurance to provide home and auto insurance across the United States. Zander is a fourth-generation family-and-employee-owned business. According to the company's website, Zander is 49% employee-owned company.

History

Zander Insurance was founded in 1925 by Herman Zander.  In 1929, Julian M. Zander incorporated the agency, maintaining an active role in the business until shortly before his death in 1983.  In 1957, his son, Julian “Bud” Zander, joined the agency. In 1986, Jeffrey J. Zander the great-grandson of Herman Zander – joined the family business, and in 2013 became the company’s CEO.

See also
 Dave Ramsey
 Answer Financial

References

External links

Benefits24 Group Website
How To Start Selling Insurance

Financial services companies established in 1925
Insurance companies of the United States
Private equity portfolio companies
1925 establishments in Tennessee
Companies based in Nashville, Tennessee